Sir Richard Reynell (died before 1213) (alias Reinell, Reynolds, etc), of Pitney (anciently Pyttney, Peteneya, eyc) in the county of Somerset, Sheriff of Devon in 1191-4, was a knight who lived during the successive reigns of Kings Henry II (1154-1189), Richard I (1189-1199) and  John (1199-1216).

Career
During the absence of King Richard I on crusade in the Holy Land, in 1191 he was given the custody of the royal fortresses of Exeter Castle in Devon and of Launceston Castle in Cornwall. These castles he stoutly defended against John, Count of Mortain, the king's younger brother, who in the monarch's absence endeavoured to usurp the sovereign power. He served as Sheriff of Devon from 1191-4. Following the death of King Richard I in 1199, the throne was inherited by his younger brother King John (1199-1216), who remembered the opposition he had received from Richard Reynell and deprived him of his estates at Pitney.

Marriage and children
He was succeeded by his son: 

Sir Richard II Reynell of Pitney, whose lands were restored to him by King John in 1213, for services rendered. Richard II's grandson was Walter Reynell, who married Maude de Trumpington, daughter and heiress of Everard de Trumpington of Trumpington in Cambridgeshire, and their son was John Reynell (d.1363/4) of Trumpington, a Member of Parliament for Cambridgeshire in 1351/2, who in 1328 was granted by King Edward III freewarren in his lands in Warwickshire. John Reynell's grandson was Walter Reynell who married Margaret Stighull, daughter and heiress of William Stighull of Malston in the parish of Sherford and of East Ogwell in Devonshire. His descendants settled at East Ogwell and at adjoining West Ogwell in Devon. A junior branch of the family became the Reynell Baronets of Laleham.

References

People from Somerset
12th-century English people
High Sheriffs of Devon
Reynell family